Pierre Louki, born Pierre Varenne on 25 July 1920 in Brienon-sur-Armançon in Yonne, died 21 December 2006, was a French actor and singer/songwriter.

Louki was the son of Georges Varenne, a teacher in the Yonne who was killed in Auschwitz. He learnt the theatre in Auxerre before going to Paris in the early 1950s, where he met Roger Blin and Jean-Louis Barrault. He subsequently played in Blin's production of En attendant Godot. He also began song-writing at this time.

Among the interpreters of Louki's more than 200 chansons (besides himself) were Lucette Raillat, Catherine Sauvage, Francesca Solleville, Isabelle Aubret, Les Frères Jacques, Juliette Gréco, Jean Ferrat, Philippe Clay, Colette Renard, Annie Cordy and Georges Brassens. He toured with the latter and wrote a book of recollections entitled Avec Brassens (éditions Christian Pirot, 1999).

He received the Académie Charles Cros prize in 1972, and in 1999, the SACEM André-Didier Mauprey prize.
Pierre Louki also appeared as stage author and actor and broadcast on France-Culture, while on television he took part in programmes of Jean-Christophe Averty.

He wrote several books for children and his memoirs are Quelques confidences (éditions Christian Pirot, septembre 2006).

Translated from French Wikipedia

1920 births
2006 deaths
People from Yonne
French children's writers
French male stage actors
20th-century French male actors
20th-century French male singers
French male singer-songwriters